Mariusz Wargocki (born 18 December 1970) of the TKN Tatra Team is a Polish ski mountaineer.

Wargocki lives in his hometown Zakopane. He started ski mountaineering in 1999 and competed first in a race in Štrbské Pleso in 2005.

Selected results 
 2005:
 1st, Polish Cup
 2006:
 2nd, Polish Championship
 2nd, Polish Cup
 2009:
 8th, European Championship relay race (together with Szymon Zachwieja, Jacek Żebracki and Andrzej Bargiel)
 2010:
 10th ("ISMF men" ranking), Patrouille des Glaciers together with Jacek Żylka-Żebracki and Andrzej Bargiel

References

External links 
 Mariusz Wargocki at Skimountaineering.org

1970 births
Living people
Polish male ski mountaineers
Sportspeople from Zakopane